The Weymouth and Portland National Sailing Academy is a centre for the sport of sailing on the Isle of Portland, Dorset, on the south coast of England. The academy building is located in Osprey Quay on the northern tip of the island, and the waters of Portland Harbour and Weymouth Bay, adjacent to the site, are the main areas used for sailing. Local, national and international sailing events have been held at the site since it was opened in 2000, and in 2005 WPNSA was selected to host the sailing events at the 2012 Olympic and Paralympic Games.

History
The academy was formed as a not-for-profit company in 1999 and officially opened on 1 April 2000. It occupied converted naval premises until a clubhouse was built, which was opened in June 2005 by the Princess Royal. £7.85 million of funding for the project was donated by charities, individuals and local councils; the National Lottery donated £3 million in 2003, and the South West Regional Development Agency added £3.34 million. The academy's aims are to promote the sport of sailing at all levels of competence and ability, through courses, training and events, and to contribute to the economic regeneration of the area. Since opening it has created a demand in service and marine industries worth around £10 million. WPNSA continues to promote sailing to local schools, offering benefits such as free boat hoist and storage. Use of the facilities and access to training is open to anyone in return for an annual membership fee. On 6 July 2005, London was chosen to host the 2012 Olympic and Paralympic Games, and the WPNSA was chosen to host the sailing events.

Facilities

Portland Harbour and Weymouth Bay are the main areas used for sailing. The clubhouse houses facilities on two floors, including a gymnasium, seven lecture and meeting rooms for 260 people, an event hall with kitchens and a bar, VIP meeting rooms and offices, a lounge bar and cafeteria seating 350 people, and two balconies. The outside of the academy complex has a  slipway and two deep water slipways, 30 pontoons with disabled access, cranage and boat hoists, boat storage and parking areas. WPNSA also operates Boscawen House, formerly an admiral's residence, which offers accommodation for a maximum of 47 people. The clubhouse generates 15–20% of its electricity from solar cells, and rainwater is collected from the roof to wash boats.

Osprey Quay
In November 2007, the South West Regional Development Agency signed a deal with Sutton Harbour Group to construct a  year-round tourist and leisure complex in Osprey Quay, between Portland Castle and the academy. The £30 million scheme, called Castle Court, includes a hotel, apartments, public areas, a restaurant, shops and other employment space, and is expected to create 300 jobs. A permanent base for the Royal Yachting Association's senior, youth, junior and paralympic national sailing squads is to be provided.

Events

Since opening the academy has hosted national and international sailing events, including the J/24 World Championships in 2005, staging trials for the 2004 Athens Olympics, the ISAF World Championship 2006, the BUCS Fleet Racing Championships, and the RYA Youth National Championships. Local events are also held at the academy; nearby schools have extra-curricular sailing lessons, and in October each year WPNSA hosts Weymouth Speed Week. The British Olympic Sailing Team train at WPNSA.

2012 Olympic and Paralympic Games
In 2005, the Weymouth and Portland National Sailing Academy (WPNSA) was chosen as the venue for the sailing competition at the London 2012 Olympic and Paralympic games.  WPNSA was chosen to host these events due to its existing World class facilities.  The Olympic Delivery Authority has built upon these facilities providing a new 220m slipway accessible at all states of tide and wind, an additional 70 marina berths and an extended dinghy park with capacity for 600 boats.  In addition, the Academy provides direct access to Portland Harbour and Weymouth Bay which have been credited as some of the best sailing waters in the World.  Olympic sailing events took place between 28 July and 11 August 2012, and Paralympic events between 31 August and 5 September.  One course was in Portland Harbour and four in Weymouth Bay.  Sailors from all over the world competed for 30 medals in the Olympic Games and 18 medals in the Paralympic Games.  A cruise liner berthed at Portland Port was used as accommodation.

There was concern about the logistics of transporting athletes from London to the academy, as there is no motorway in Dorset, and transport links are already often congested in summer. Weymouth and Portland Borough Council lobbied the Department for Transport to reinstate double track between Moreton and Dorchester South on the South West Main Line and increase services from Weymouth railway station to London Waterloo and Bristol, and to introduce new direct services to Exeter. Services to London Waterloo began running every 30 minutes from December 2007, but services through Bristol to Cardiff were stopped. Work on the road commenced in 2008, and as anticipated it was completed in three years, in time for the 2012 Olympic sailing events.

The academy also hosted the Moth World Championships in 2008.

2016 Vintage Yachting Games

The Vintage Yachting Games (Vintage) are the International Post-Olympic Yachting/Sailing event for former Olympic classes. The Vintage is held every four years.

During the closing ceremony of the 2012 Vintage Yachting Games at Lake Como Italy, the Weymouth and Portland National Sailing Academy (WPNSA) was formally announced as the venue for the 2016 Vintage Yachting Games.
 The Academy later withdrew from hosting these games, necessitating postponement to 2018 and transfer to another host in Denmark.

References

External links

Official website
London 2012 Olympics profile

1999 establishments in England
Venues of the 2012 Summer Olympics
Olympic sailing venues
Sport in Weymouth, Dorset
Buildings and structures in Weymouth, Dorset
Sail training associations
Isle of Portland
Marinas in England
2012 Summer Paralympic venues
Sports academies